Richard Gibson (born 1954) is a British actor.

Richard Gibson may also refer to:

 Richard Gibson (MP) (died 1534), Member of Parliament for New Romney constituency, Kent
 Richard Gibson (painter) (1615–1690), English miniature painter and court dwarf
 Richard Gibson (priest) (died 1904), Archdeacon of Suffolk
 Dick Gibson (footballer) (1866–1943), Australian rules footballer
 Richard Gibson (footballer) (1889–?), English footballer
 Dick Gibson (American football) (1900–1968), American football player
 Patrick Gibson, Baron Gibson (Richard Patrick Tallentyre Gibson, 1916–2004), British businessman in the publishing industry
 Dick Gibson (racing driver) (1918–2010), British racing driver
 Richard Thomas Gibson (born 1931), American journalist, member of the Fair Play for Cuba Committee, fired from Agence France-Presse
 Rick Gibson (born 1951), Canadian sculptor and artist
 Richard Gibson (composer) (born 1953), Canadian classical music composer
 Rick Gibson (golfer) (born 1961), Canadian golfer

See also